Le convenienze ed inconvenienze teatrali (Conventions and Inconveniences of the Stage), also known as Viva la mamma and Viva la Diva, is a dramma giocoso, or opera, in two acts by Gaetano Donizetti. The Italian libretto was written by Domenico Gilardoni, adapted from Antonio Simeone Sografi's plays Le convenienze teatrali (1794) and Le inconvenienze teatrali (1800).

The title refers to the convenienze, which were the rules relating to the ranking of singers (primo, secondo, comprimario) in 19th-century Italian opera, and the number of scenes, arias etc. that they were entitled to expect.

Performance history 
19th century

The opera was originally a one-act farsa based on Le convenienze teatrali; this version premiered at the Teatro Nuovo in Naples on 21 November 1827.  Donizetti revised it and added recitatives and material from Le inconvenienze teatrali; this final version premiered at the Teatro alla Cannobiana in Milan on 20 April 1831.

20th century and beyond

Convenienze had its first major modern revival in 1963 in Siena, and has subsequently appeared in a number of translations and under various titles, most notably as Viva la mamma, a German adaptation presented in Munich in 1969.

In the UK, the first staged performance was not given until 9 April 1976 by an amateur company, the Harrow Opera Workshop, but that performance had been preceded by a 1969 BBC broadcast under the name of Upstage and Downstage and in 1972 Opera Rara, the recording company, produced the one-act version in English as The Prima Donna's Mother is a Drag.  In the US, the first production was given in Terre Haute, Indiana on 2 April 1966.

A 2004 production at the Opera of Monte Carlo starred June Anderson.  In October 2009, the opera was performed at La Scala as Le Convenienze ed inconvenienze teatrali, under the direction of Marco Guidarini and there is a live DVD recording of this performance.

This opera was staged in 2017 in the Estates Theatre of the Czech National Theatre in Prague.
A contemporary version in English by Kit Hesketh-Harvey entitled Viva La Diva was staged, in association with the Salzburg State Theatre, at the Buxton Opera House as part of the 2022 Buxton International Festival, with the Northern Chamber Orchestra, directed by Stephen Medcalf, and with George Humphreys in the role of Agata (who becomes "Lady Wigan" in the contemporary English production).

Roles

Synopsis 
Time: 18th century
Place: "A provincial Italian theatre"

A regional (and mediocre) operatic troupe is rehearsing a new work—Romulus and Ersilia —and faces numerous obstacles. The prima donna acts every bit the diva, refusing to rehearse.  The German tenor cannot master either the lyrics or melodies.  In the midst of much quarrelling, various singers threaten to walk out.  The situation turns more dire with the arrival of Mamma Agata (a baritone role), the mother of the seconda donna. She insists on a solo for her daughter and even issues detailed demands on the musical arrangement of the aria. When the German tenor refuses to go on, he is replaced by the prima donna's husband.  The show eventually collapses, and rather than pay back all the investors (whose money has already been spent), the company flees the town under cover of night.

Notes

Recordings

References
Notes

Cited sources
Ashbrook, William; Sarah Hibberd (2001), in  Holden, Amanda (Ed.), The New Penguin Opera Guide, New York: Penguin Putnam. .  pp. 224 – 247.
Osborne, Charles, (1994),  The Bel Canto Operas of Rossini, Donizetti, and Bellini,  Portland, Oregon: Amadeus Press. 

Sources
Allitt, John Stewart (1991), Donizetti: in the light of Romanticism and the teaching of Johann Simon Mayr, Shaftesbury: Element Books, Ltd (UK); Rockport, MA: Element, Inc.(USA)
Ashbrook, William (1982), Donizetti and His Operas, Cambridge University Press.  
Ashbrook, William (1998), "Donizetti, Gaetano" in Stanley Sadie  (Ed.),  The New Grove Dictionary of Opera, Vol. One. London: Macmillan Publishers, Inc.   
Black, John (1982), Donizetti’s Operas in Naples, 1822—1848. London: The Donizetti Society.
Loewenberg, Alfred (1970). Annals of Opera, 1597-1940, 2nd edition.  Rowman and Littlefield
Sadie, Stanley, (Ed.); John Tyrell (Exec. Ed.) (2004), The New Grove Dictionary of Music and Musicians.  2nd edition. London: Macmillan.    (hardcover).   (eBook).
 Weinstock, Herbert (1963), Donizetti and the World of Opera in Italy, Paris, and Vienna in the First Half of the Nineteenth Century, New York: Pantheon Books.

External links
 Viva la Mamma on opera-national-de-lyon
  Donizetti Society (London) website
 Libretto (two act version) (Italian)
 Le Convenienze ed Inconvenienze Teatrali (Viva la Mamma) - Gaetano Donizetti - 2002 on YouTube

Italian-language operas
Drammi giocosi
Operas by Gaetano Donizetti
Opera buffa
Farse
Operas
1831 operas
1827 operas
Operas based on plays
Operas set in Italy